Thomas Whatman (1576–1630), of Chichester, Sussex, was an English politician.

He was a Member (MP) of the Parliament of England for Chichester in 1621 and 1624 and for Portsmouth in 1626.

References

1576 births
1630 deaths
17th-century English lawyers
Alumni of Hart Hall, Oxford
People from Chichester
Members of the Parliament of England (pre-1707) for Portsmouth
English MPs 1621–1622
English MPs 1624–1625
English MPs 1626
Members of the Inner Temple